Mariana Gheorghe (born 1956) is the first woman general manager of Petrom. Since the 15 June 2006, Mariana Gheorghe was the general executive director of PETROM, replacing Gheorghe Constantinescu who was named councilor for the president of OMV, Wolfgang Ruttenstorfer.

Biography

Education 

Mariana Gheorghe graduated from the Faculty of International Relations of the Bucharest Academy of Economic Studies in 1979. Ten years later she graduated from the Faculty of Law of the University of Bucharest in 1989 and she took the Corporate Finance Program at the London Business School in 1995.

Professional experience 
Mariana Gheorghe started her career in 1979, working in two Romanian companies, Policolor and Chimica / Romferchim until 1991. Between 1991 and 1993, she worked for the Romanian Ministry of Finance, where she was second-in-command to the General Director of the International Finance Department. Beginning in 1993, she worked for the European Bank of Reconstruction and Development, first as Associated Banker, Main Banker and then as Senior Banker for Southeastern Europe, Caspian Region and Caucasus. After Petrom was privatised in 2004, Mariana Gheorghe became a Member of the Administration Council of Petrom representing EBRD until the 15th of June 2006 when was named General Executive Director of Petrom. Since the 17th of April 2007, Mariana Gheorghe also holds the position of President of the Petrom Directorate, following the adoption of a dual governing system by Petrom.

Prizes 
 Mariana Gheorghe is the first Romanian executive and the only manager in Southeastern Europe to enter the Most Powerful Women in the Business list, compiled by Fortune magazine, in 27th place.
 Mariana Gheorghe was named CEO of the Year 2012 by The Marketer magazine.
 Mariana Gheorghe ranked 1st in the Top Successful Women list made by Unica magazine.
 Mariana Gheorghe was named Most admired CEO by Business Magazine for 2 years in a row (2010 and 2011).
 Mariana Gheorghe was named Most influent woman in Romania by Forbes Romania in 2012 and 2013. 
 Mariana Gheorghe ranked 1st in the Business Leader of the Year list, made by Business Review magazine.
 Mariana Gheorghe received the Doctor Honoris Causa Beneficiorul Publicorum distinction from the West University of Timișoara, Faculty of Economics and Business Administration in 2014.
 Mariana Gheorghe ranked 5th in Top most influential women in Romania, list made by Forbes Romania in 2014.

Organization memberships 
 Member of the Board of Directors in the Foreign Investors Council (FIC) in Romania since May 2012. She was FIC president in 2010 and 2011.
The Foreign Investors Council (FIC) reunites 123 multinational companies, represented by presidents and executive directors. Since its inception, the Foreign Investors Council has been a constant presence in the dialogue regarding economic growth, the increase of investments and the development of the business environment. 
 President of the Institute for Corporate Governance (ICG).
 Vice-President Aspen Institute Romania.
 Member of the World Energy Council (WEC).
 Member of the Romanian Association of the Roma Club (RAoRC).

Bibliography 

 Source: wall-street.ro

References

External links

Interviews 
 Mariana Gheorghe, the banker behind the giant Petrom, 12 February 2007, Claudiu Vrînceanu, Wall Street
 Life at the height of the largest company in Romania, 8 March 2010, Raluca Barbuneanu, Capital
 Mariana Gheorghe: „The situation is critical, we must act now!“, 11 October 2010, Ovidiu Nahoi, Ion M. Ioniță, Adevărul
 Interview with Mariana Gheorghe, 18 March 2012, Business 24
 13 global newcomers, 21 September 2012, Rupali Arora, Money
 For two years in a row, Mariana Gheorghe was declared "The most admired CEO in Romania". Where is she now?, 20 November 2012, Răzvan Mureșan, Business Magazin
 Mariana Gheorghe: A higher tax may lead to lower investment on medium and long term, 21 February 2013, Hotnews
 Mariana Gheorghe: Stimulating investment and lower HMO - essential for economical growth, 23 May 2013, Moise Guran, TVR News

1956 births
Living people
Women business executives
Romanian businesspeople
Romanian women in business